N'Dea Davenport (born September 22, 1966) is an American singer, songwriter, dancer and producer. She was the lead vocalist in the UK acid jazz band the Brand New Heavies and made pioneering contributions to the genre of acid jazz.

Career

Her diverse projects include collaborations with music producers and artists, such as Mark Ronson, Louie Vega, Roger Sanchez, Guru’s Jazzmatazz, Madonna, Natalie Merchant, Mos Def, Sly and Robbie, J Dilla, and Malcolm McLaren. Dance scholarships, acting and music were the core of her developments as an artist and entertainer.  Immediately after finishing college, she left her then home of Atlanta, Georgia, en route to Los Angeles. There she engaged in theatrical productions and commercial music video and was embraced by artists in both art, music and popular culture. Her legacy as an artist began also with her involvement in the burgeoning Los Angeles underground club and rave scene in the late 1980s and early 1990s.

Working simultaneously as a dance artist and recording and commercial studio session singer, Davenport was soon connected with Fab Five Freddy, who recommended her to a DJ friend at new upstart label Delicious Vinyl. Eurythmics member and producer Dave Stewart offered Davenport a recording contract a year prior when introduced through a collaboration with Bootsy Collins and Malcolm McLaren, where she was featured on McLaren's Waltz Darling LP. She declined Stewart’s offer at the time due to his requirement for her to relocate to London, England. Later to ink a solo development deal with Delicious Vinyl, who made introductions to her future bandmates, The Brand New Heavies who at the time had no singer.  With the core band members based in London, she decided to relocate there.

The band’s initial UK indie label Acid Jazz Records, struck a deal with London Records for distribution in Europe and the rest of the world. During this period, the band produced a string of international albums and singles, invigorating a global movement and popularized the musical term known as acid jazz. Parallel to this, Davenport completed work on Guru's Jazzmatazz, Vol. 1, with Guru.

In 1995, Davenport left the group citing irreconcilable differences, returning to the US and choosing New Orleans as a home base while she pursued other collaborations, and completed work on her solo recording with Delicious Vinyl. Encouragement received from her associate and record producer Daniel Lanois, resulted in the completion of her debut solo effort as producer, all except for four songs, produced by Dallas Austin. While her association with Delicious Vinyl was dissolving, Davenport's project was picked up by the newly formed label owned by Sir Richard Branson. In 1998, her self-titled debut solo recording on V2 Records was released. She toured extensively in support of the album, around Europe, North America and Australia and with the concert series Lilith Fair. When the relationship at V2 came to an end she continued musically primarily focusing on European dance music projects.

Davenport held residency in New Orleans but lived primarily in New York City.  Her diverse musical tastes led to an eventual stance as a New York club DJ and she continues to DJ on special events around Asia. In 2006, she re-emerged once more with the Brand New Heavies for one last album release of Get Used To It. Her latest project is with collaborator Katsuya Everywhere in the multi-media based electronic and acoustic duo Celectrixx, which was conceived in Japan.

Discography

Solo album
 N'Dea Davenport (1998)

The Brand New Heavies albums
 The Brand New Heavies (1990)
 Heavy Rhyme Experience, Vol. 1 (1992)
 Brother Sister (1994)
 Get Used to It (2006)

References

External links
Brand New Heavies – official site

1966 births
20th-century American singers
20th-century American women singers
21st-century American singers
21st-century American women singers
Acid jazz musicians
African-American women singer-songwriters
American contemporary R&B singers
American funk singers
American sopranos
American soul singers
Delicious Vinyl artists
Living people
Musicians from Atlanta
The Brand New Heavies members
20th-century African-American women singers
21st-century African-American women singers